David B. Malament (born 21 December 1947) is an American philosopher of science, specializing in the philosophy of physics.

Biography
Malament attended Stuyvesant High School and received a B.A. in mathematics 1968 at Columbia College, Columbia University, and Ph.D. in philosophy 1975 at Rockefeller University. After teaching for nearly a quarter-century at the University of Chicago, Malament left to become Distinguished Professor of Logic and Philosophy of Science at the University of California, Irvine, where he is now emeritus.  His book Topics in the Foundations of General Relativity and Newtonian Gravitation Theory (Chicago, 2012) was awarded the 2014 Lakatos Award.

Malament's work focuses the conceptual foundations of the special and general theories of relativity. Regarding whether simultaneity in special relativity, the Einstein synchronisation is conventional, Malament argues against conventionalism and is regarded by some as having refuted Adolf Grünbaum's argument for conventionalism. Grünbaum, as well as  Sahotra Sarkar and John Stachel, don't agree, whereas Robert Rynasiewicz sides with Malament.

During the Vietnam War Malament was a conscientious objector to the draft, spending time in jail for refusing induction into the military.   He published an article on the subject of selective conscientious objection in an early issue of the journal Philosophy and Public Affairs.

References

External links 
 
 Malament's homepage at UCI
 Articles available at the philsci server

1947 births
Living people
20th-century American philosophers
21st-century American philosophers
University of California, Irvine faculty
21st-century American physicists
American conscientious objectors
Philosophers of physics
Columbia College (New York) alumni